Káranice is a municipality and village in Hradec Králové District in the Hradec Králové Region of the Czech Republic. It has about 200 inhabitants.

References

Villages in Hradec Králové District